A taboo is a social prohibition or ban.

Taboo may also refer to:

Film, television, and plays
 Taboo (1922 play), by Mary Hoyt Wiborg
 Taboo (film series), a 1980s series of pornographic movies
 Taboo (1980 film), the first of the above series
 Taboo (1999 film), a Japanese film
 Taboo (2002 film), an American film
 Taboo (2015 film), an Iranian film
 Taboo (musical), a 2002 play about the life of Boy George
 Taboo (2002 TV series), a documentary series on National Geographic Channel
 Taboo (2017 TV series), a period drama on BBC One
 Taboo (Australian TV series), a comedic series on Network 10

Literature
 Taboo (book), a book containing a series of lectures on the subject by Franz Baermann Steiner
 Taboo (comics), an anthology published by Stephen R. Bissette

Music
 Taboo (band), a German Eurodance group
 Taboo (Boy George albums), 2002
 Taboo (Buck-Tick album), 1989
 "Taboo" (Christabelle Borg song), 2018 song that represented Malta in the Eurovision Song Contest 2018
 "Taboo" (Don Omar song), 2011
 "Taboo" (Glamma Kid song), 1999
 "Taboo" (Kumi Koda song), 2008
 Taboo (rapper) (born 1975), member of The Black Eyed Peas
 "Taboo" or "Tabú", Afro-Cuban song by Margarita Lecuona, covered by many others
 "Taboo", a 1998 song by Claudia Christian
 "Taboo", a song by September from the 2007 album Dancing Shoes
 "Taboo", a song by Diaura from the album Focus
 taboo, a 2008 album and song of Max Koffler

Other uses
 Taboo (drink), a vodka based liqueur with wine and tropical fruit juices
 Taboo (game), a 1989 word guessing party board game
 Taboo: The Sixth Sense, a 1989 tarot reading video game by Rare

See also 
 Tabo (disambiguation)
 Tabou (disambiguation)
 Tabu
 Tabuu, the final boss in Super Smash Bros. Brawl
 Ta13oo, album by Denzel Curry
 Word taboo